A belt-driven bicycle is a chainless bicycle that uses a toothed synchronous belt to transmit power from the pedals to the wheel. 

The application of belt drives to bicycles is growing, especially in the commuter bicycle market, due to the low maintenance and lubrication-free benefits. Belt drives are also available for stationary and fitness bicycles.

Benefits 
 Belts do not rust.
 Lubrication is not required.
 Cleanliness due to lack of lubrication.
 Little to no maintenance.
 Smoother operation.
 Quieter than chain.
 Longer life than metal bicycle chains.
 Some belt systems are lighter than conventional chain-driven system.

Drawbacks 
 Derailleurs cannot be used, so a hub gear is used if multiple gear ratios are required.
 Most belts cannot be taken apart as a chain can, so a frame must be able to accommodate the belt by having an opening in the rear triangle or an elevated chain stay. There is only one option where the belt can be spliced and joined through the rear triangle.
 Belts come in limited selection of lengths, which must be accommodated in the design of the frame.
 Belt-driven bicycles and their repair or replacement parts are scarcer at shops than bicycles with conventional chain.
 Front and rear pulleys or sprockets must be well aligned to avoid excessive friction and wear. A chain is more flexible in this respect.
 Compared to a chain, belts are typically run at a much higher tension.  This is done in order to avoid skipping of the belt while in use.  However, high belt tensions can reduce the life expectancy of the bearings in the bottom bracket, as well as in the rear hub.
 First-generation pulleys with dual guides had problems with snow becoming compacted and trapped in the pulley (up to complete inoperability in some cases).  Second generation (one guide, wheel side) and third generation (center guide) improve upon the design.

Tensioning 
Tensioning can be implemented in all the same ways that single-speed chain drives can be tensioned. The fork ends for the rear axle are horizontal, in line with the belt, with or without chain tugs, which allows the distance between the rear wheel axle and the crank axle to be adjusted. The fork ends themselves can be moved, to change the distance between the rear wheel axle and the crank spindle. The fork ends are fixed but there is a separate tensioner pulley, which changes the travel distance of the belt. An eccentric, either in the bottom bracket or the rear hub.

History 

A belt drive for a bicycle was patented in the United States on April 8, 1890 by Charles D. Rice, Patent # 425,390. No evidence has been found that it was ever used, but some motorcycles used leather belts in the early 1900s. The Bridgestone Picnica belt-drive bicycle was introduced in the early 1980s. It used a tooth-belt drive like auto timing belts and Harley-Davidson drive belts, along with a novel two-part chainring that increased belt tension with increasing load. The Picnica was a folding bicycle, and part of the appeal of the belt drive was cleanliness. The Picnica was a small-wheel bicycle, so belt tension may have been less than on a bicycle with standard-size wheels. It was apparently successful, but was offered mainly in Japan.

Bridgestone offered belt-drive bicycles in the USA until they left the market about 1994. Since their innovation, they have continuously offered belt-drive bicycles in Japan including their best-selling Albelt model.

In 1984 and 1985, Mark Sanders, a designer who had earned his degree in mechanical engineering from Imperial College, London, designed a folding bicycle as part of his graduate studies in an Industrial Design Engineering (IDE) program. The program was run jointly by Imperial College and the Royal College of Art in London. He collaborated with a design engineer from Gates Corporation to outfit his bicycle with a belt, rather than a chain.

When his project was complete, Sanders chose entrepreneur and former Greg Norman manager James Marshall and a Glasgow manufacturer to turn his award-winning design into a product. The manufacturer coined the name Strida, and in 1987 the bicycle began rolling off the production line. In 2002 production was moved to Taiwanese manufacturer Ming Cycle in order to meet increased demand, and as of 2007, Ming Cycle fully owned the Strida brand and intellectual property rights.

iXi bicycles, distributed in the United States by Delta Cycle Corporation, followed in 2004 with a compact design that, like Strida, featured a belt drive. Other folding-bike manufacturers that have implemented a belt drive include U.S. company Bike Friday and Netherlands-based Bernds.

In 2007, Gates Corporation developed a high-modulus synchronous belt and sprocket system called the Carbon Drive System. The belt's pitch allowed for lower tension requirements to help prevent skipping. Lightweight, patent-pending sprockets have mud ports, openings under each tooth, which work to slough off debris.

In 2009, an increasing number of bicycle companies, including Trek and f8 Cycles, offered belt-driven bicycles. While builders initially focused on single-speeds and internal hubs, in early 2009 f8 used a Gates-compatible fixed-gear cog designed by Phil Wood & Co., offering a belt-driven fixed-gear bicycle.

In 2009, Wayne Lumpkin, owner of Spot Brand and best known as the founder of Avid, designed a belt system called CenterTrack. In 2010, Gates Corporation acquired a patent from Lumpkin for CenterTrack, a new belt-and-pulley design that improves on the initial Carbon Drive System design. CenterTrack is more tolerant to misalignment than its predecessors. It is also lighter, 20% stronger due to a wider belt, yet has narrower pulleys, making packaging with the latest generation of internally geared hubs much easier.

In 2010, Daimler introduced the Smart eBike, a power-electric hybrid bicycle featuring Gates Carbon drive-belt system. The eBike is  designed for a clean, grease-free ride. 
Other notable eBike brands include Grace and Pi-Mobility.

In 2018, Veer Cycles created the first belt drive conversion kit that allows riders to convert their chain driven bikes to belt drives. The belt is spliced to fit through the rear triangle and eliminates the need for a frame with a split already in it.

The possibilities for belt-driven bicycles are increasing as manufacturers of internal hub gears (gears inside the rear hub, which allow riders of belt-driven bicycles to shift easily) introduce new designs such as the Shimano Alfine 11 and Fallbrook Technologies's NuVinci. Other major internally geared hub makers include SRAM, Sturmey-Archer and Rohloff.

Another option to provide gears is to create a gearbox bicycle using a bracket-mounted gearbox like the Pinion P.18.

Manufacturers 

The belts are typically made by the same manufacturing companies that produce toothed belts for automobiles, machinery, and other synchronous belt-drive applications.

 Gates (USA)
 Veer (USA)
 Continental (till 2018, Germany)

Notable manufacturers of belt-driven bicycles or belt drives include:
Avanti
BMC Trading — Lifestyle models Urban Challenge and Mass Challenge
Boardman – URB 9.4
Bridgestone — Albelt, Beltrex
Canyon  Safety Advisory for Continental CDS Belt 
Co-Motion Cycles — Americano, Pangea, CityView and Speedster (tandem) bicycle models
Continental AG — CONTI® DRIVE SYSTEM (CDS) belt drives and sprockets Safety Advisory and Recall
Cube Bikes — Cube hyde pro
Cycle Union
Daimler – Smart eBike creators featuring Gates belt drive
Diamant
Focus Bikes
Gates Corporation — sprockets and carbon fiber reinforced polyurethane belt drives
Ikea — SLADDAl
Kalkhoff – Voyager De Luxe model and Endeavour 8 Gates
Marin
Priority Bicycles – Priority Classic & Priority 8
Raleigh
Scott
Specialized — Source Eleven model
Strida — a portable, folding bicycle
Trek Bicycle Company — District, Soho and Zektor bicycle models. Also under the Villager brand.

Gallery

See also 
 Chainless bicycle
 Outline of cycling

References

External links 
BikeCAD modeling a chain or belt drive.

Cycle types